John Hollings Addison (December 18, 1929 – February 23, 2010) was a Canadian politician and business executive. He was a Liberal Member of Parliament for the riding of York North from 1962 to 1968.

References 

1929 births
2010 deaths
Liberal Party of Canada MPs
Members of the House of Commons of Canada from Ontario
Politicians from Toronto